Felix may refer to: 

 Felix (name), people and fictional characters with the name

Places 
 Arabia Felix is the ancient Latin name of Yemen
 Felix, Spain, a municipality of the province Almería, in the autonomous community of Andalusia, Spain
 St. Felix, Prince Edward Island, a rural community in Prince County, Prince Edward Island, Canada.
 Felix, Ontario, an unincorporated place and railway point in Northeastern Ontario, Canada
 St. Felix, South Tyrol, a village in South Tyrol, in northern Italy.
 Felix, California, an unincorporated community in Calaveras County

Music 
 Felix (band), a British band
 Felix (musician), British DJ
 Félix Award, a Quebec music award named after Félix Leclerc

Business 
 Felix (pet food), a brand of cat food sold in most European countries
 AB Felix, a Swedish food company
 Felix Bus Services of Derbyshire, England
 Felix Airways, an airline based in Yemen

Science and technology 
 Apache Felix, an open source OSGi framework by Apache Software Foundation
 1664 Felix, an asteroid
 Free-electron laser for infrared experiments (FELIX), a type of laser
 FELIX (experiment), a Roger Penrose proposal for evaluating whether macroscopic systems can be in superposition states

Warfare 
 Operation Felix, a German World War II project to conquer Gibraltar
 VB-6 Felix, an infrared-guided bomb
 Dieter Gerhardt (born 1935), South African navy commander convicted of treason, code named Felix

Other uses 
 Felix (newspaper), the weekly students' newspaper of Imperial College, London
 Felix (ship, 1993), a passenger ship operating on Lake Zurich in Switzerland
 Hurricane Felix (disambiguation), various storms
 Venus Felix (sculpture), a sculpture of Venus and her son Cupid
 Felix (Hewlett-Packard), a codename for the HP 200LX palmtop PC
 Felix (1921 film), a Norwegian silent drama film
 Felix (1996 film), a Slovene film
 Felix Media, film company resident at Carriageworks arts centre in Sydney, Australia

See also 
 Felix the Cat (disambiguation)
 St. Felix's flood, a flood disaster that struck the Netherlands in 1530
 Saint-Félix (disambiguation), the name or part of the name of several communes in France
 San Félix (disambiguation), the name of two places in South America
 Church of St. Felix (disambiguation)